Innocent Criminals may refer to:
Silverchair, an Australian rock band formerly named Innocent Criminals
Ben Harper and the Innocent Criminals, an American rock band featuring Ben Harper